is a city located in Kagoshima Prefecture, Japan, founded on April 1, 1954. In March 1, 2012, the city had an estimated population of 43,931, with 19,119 households and a population density of 294.82 persons per km2. However the census of 2020 confirmed a population decline to 39,011  and by October 2022 there were only 17,537 households .

On January 1, 2006, the towns of Kaimon and Yamagawa (both from Ibusuki District) were merged into Ibusuki.

Ibusuki can be accessed by Routes 226 and 269 and the Ibusuki Skyline drive. The city's main railroad station is Ibusuki Station.

Ibusuki is famous for black-sand spas known as sunamushi onsen and the fine noodle sōmen nagashi.

Ibusuki has a sister city relationship with Rockhampton, Queensland, Australia.

Geography
Points of interest include:
 Kirishima-Kinkowan National Park contains in its Kagoshima Bay region:
Kaimondake volcano
An inactive stratovolcano at the end of the Satsuma Peninsula
 Chiringashima
Island in Kagoshima Bay
 Lake Ikeda
A volcanic Caldera
 Tōsenkyō
 Ryūgū Shrine
The city includes the following districts from the west:
Kaimonjutcho
The northern aspect of Mount Kaimon and adjacent sea coast of Satsuma Peninsula
Kaimonkawashiri
The southern aspect Mount Kaimon and adjacent sea coast of Satsuma Peninsula
Kaimonsenta
From Kaimonjutcho and Kaimonkawashiri to Lake Ikeda
Ikeda
Northern Lake Ikeda to the west
Iwamoto
North of Ikeda to the west coast at Kagoshima Bay 
Komaki
regions north west of Iwamoto to the west coast at Kagoshima Bay 
Yamagawaokachogamizu
The coast including Cape Nagasakibana at the entrance to Kagoshima Bay 
Kaimonueno
From Lake Ikeda towards the south
Yamagawatoshinaga
Adjacent to eastern shore Lake Ikeda
Yamagawaoyama
to the west of Yamagawaogawa from Nishi-Ōyama rail station to Lake Unagi
Yamagawaogawa
extends from near the sea almost to Lake Unagi a volcanic crater
Yamagawanarikawa
Surrounds of Lake Unagi to the northern aspects Yamagawa harbour
Nishikata
from west of Lake Unagi to Kagoshima Bay including the land corridor to Ibusuki
Higashikata
Rural north of Lake Unagi almost to the coast of Kagoshima Bay missing the main land corridor to Ibusuki and includes Chiringashima
Yamagawafukumoto
coast at entrance to Kagoshima Bay and includes southern aspects Yamagawa harbour
Yamagawaasahicho
coastal in Yamagawa harbour within Kagoshima Bay
Shinnishikata
Northern inland area
Junicho
 Almost from Lake Unagi to the east, mainly inland but reaching the coast at northern aspect Yamagawa harbour
Omure
Central Ibusuki to the north and reaching Kagoshima Bay
Minato
Central Ibusuki to the north and reaching Kagoshima Bay
Yunohama
South of Ibusukifrom railway to coast of Kagoshima Bay
Kiirenukumicho
North of Komaki along the coast of Kagoshima Bay
Yamagawayamashitacho

Geology

The city has many volcanoes and hot springs of the Ibusuki Volcanic Field. The Yamagawa Binary Power Station uses local geothermal power to contribute a maximum of 4990 kW  as a "green energy" source.

Climate
Ibusuki has a humid subtropical climate (Köppen climate classification Cfa) with hot summers and mild winters. Precipitation is significant throughout the year, and is heavier in summer, especially the months of June and July. Due to its marine subtropical climate, the city is the northern limit in Japan where cycads grow naturally.

Demographics
Per Japanese census data, the population of Ibusuki in 2020 is 39,011 people. Since the census began in Ibusuki in 1950, the town's population has been slowly declining, with no signs of picking up until 2020 but the latest data suggests further decline.

Culture
 Hirasaki Shrine
 Iwasaki Art Museum
 Ibusuki Onsen
 Ibusuki Experimental Botanical Garden

Transport
 Higashi-Kaimon Station
 Ibusuki Station
 Irino Station
 Kaimon Station
 Miyagahama Station
 Nigatsuden Station
 Nishi-Ōyama Station
 Ōyama Station
 Satsuma-Imaizumi Station
 Satsuma-Kawashiri Station
 Yamakawa Station

Twin Cities
Chitose in Hokkaidō
Rockhampton in Australia

References

External links

 Ibusuki City official website 
 Kagoshima Prefectural Visitors Bureau official website 
 
 Photos of the sand baths at Ibusuki and area attractions

 
Cities in Kagoshima Prefecture